Aethes sexdentata is a species of moth of the family Tortricidae. It is found in North America, where it has been recorded from Nova Scotia, Ontario, Quebec, Connecticut, Illinois, Indiana, Maine, Massachusetts, Michigan, Minnesota, Mississippi, Nebraska, New Jersey, Pennsylvania, Vermont, Washington, West Virginia and Wisconsin. The habitat consists of deciduous forest openings and blueberry thickets.

The ground colour of the forewings is white, dusted with buff scales. The hindwings are dark drab. Adults have been recorded on wing from May to August, probably in one generation per year.

The larvae feed on Solidago species.

Etymology
The species name refers to the spines on the harpe.

References

sexdentata
Moths described in 2002
Moths of North America